The 2011–12 IFA Championship (known as the Belfast Telegraph Championship for sponsorship reasons) was the fourth season since its establishment after a major overhaul of the league system in Northern Ireland. The season began on 6 August 2011, and ended on 1 May 2012.

In Championship 1, Ballinamallard United were the champions by 12 points. They achieved promotion to the top flight of Northern Irish football for the first time in their history. Newry City finished as runners-up, but were defeated 3–2 by Lisburn Distillery in the promotion/relegation play-off, losing out on promotion. Glebe Rangers and Banbridge Town finished in the bottom two and were relegated to Championship 2 for next season.

In Championship 2, Coagh United were the eventual winners, with Dundela finishing as runners-up. Both achieved promotion to next season's Championship 1. Chimney Corner avoided relegation to a lower tier regional league despite finishing bottom of Championship 2 for the third successive season. This was because none of the four regional league champions applied to enter the Championship.

Team changes from 2010–11
Carrick Rangers were last season's champions of Championship 1, achieving promotion to the 2011–12 IFA Premiership. Newry City replaced them for this season's Championship 1, after finishing in 12th place in the previous season's Premiership.

Promoted from Championship 1 to IFA Premiership
 Carrick Rangers (1st in Championship 1)

Relegated from IFA Premiership to Championship 1
 Newry City (12th in IFA Premiership)

Promoted from Championship 2 to Championship 1
 Warrenpoint Town (1st in Championship 2)
 Tobermore United (2nd in Championship 2)

Relegated from Championship 1 to Championship 2
 Ballymoney United (13th in Championship 1)
 Ballyclare Comrades (14th in Championship 1)

Championship 1

Stadia and locations

League table

Results
Each team plays every other team twice (once at home, and once away) for a total of 26 games.

Championship 2

Stadia and locations

League table

Results
Each team plays every other team twice (once at home, and once away) for a total of 30 games.

References

2011-12
North
2